Joana Filipa da Silva Cunha (born 19 October 1994) is a Portuguese taekwondo female athlete. She won the silver medal at the 2015 Summer Universiade on the Women's featherweight category representing Portugal.

She competed in the women's featherweight event at the 2022 World Taekwondo Championships held in Guadalajara, Mexico.

References

Portuguese female taekwondo practitioners
Living people
1994 births
Sportspeople from Vila Nova de Gaia
Universiade medalists in taekwondo
Universiade silver medalists for Portugal
European Games competitors for Portugal
Taekwondo practitioners at the 2015 European Games
Medalists at the 2015 Summer Universiade
21st-century Portuguese women